The history of the arrival of Islam in Indonesia is somewhat unclear. One theory states that Islam arrived directly from Arabia as early as the 9th century, during the time of the Umayyad and Abbasid caliphates. Another theory credits Sufi travelers for bringing Islam in the 12th or 13th century either from Gujarat in India or from Persia. Before the archipelago's conversion to Islam, the predominant religions in Indonesia were Hinduism (particularly its Shaivism tradition) and Buddhism.

The islands that now constitute Indonesia have been recognized for centuries as a source of spices such as nutmeg and cloves, which were key commodities in the Spice trade long before the Portuguese arrived in the Banda Islands in 1511. Due to the archipelago's strategic place as the gateway between the Muslim world and Imperial China, it became a busy international hub for merchants engaged in many forms of trade. It became the place where different peoples shared their respective cultures, one of it being the Islamic faith.

Despite being one of the most significant developments in Indonesian history, evidence about the coming of Islam to Indonesia is limited; there is considerable debate among scholars about what conclusions can be drawn about the conversion of Indonesian peoples. The primary evidence, at least of the earlier stages of the process, are gravestones and a few travelers' accounts, but these can only show that indigenous Muslims were in a certain place at a certain time. This evidence cannot explain more complicated matters such as how lifestyles were affected by the new religion or how deeply it affected societies. It cannot be assumed, for example, that because a ruler was known to be a Muslim, therefore the Islamization of that area was widespread. Nevertheless, a clear turning point occurred when the Hindu Majapahit empire in Java fell to the Islamised Demak Sultanate. In 1527, the Muslim ruler renamed the newly conquered Sunda Kelapa as Jayakarta (meaning "precious victory") which was eventually contracted to Jakarta.

The spread of Islam was slow. The limited evidence that is currently known suggests that the spread of Islam accelerated in the 15th century. One of the defining characteristics of the spread of Islam in Indonesia was that it was achieved through generally peaceful means. As Muslim traders settled in coastal areas, they began to assimilate with the local population. Soon new Muslim communities were created as evidenced by the travel journals of Ibn Battuta, Zheng He, and Marco Polo. Many Muslims inter-married with royalties with their descendants establishing various Sultanates in Sumatra and Java. Thus, ending the Hindu-Buddha chapter of Indonesian history.

Dominant kingdoms included Mataram in Central Java, and the sultanates of Ternate and Tidore in the Maluku Islands to the east. By the end of the 13th century, Islam had been established in North Sumatra; by the 14th in northeast Malaya, Brunei, the southern Philippines and among some courtiers of East Java; and the 15th in Malacca and other areas of the Malay Peninsula. Although it is known that the spread of Islam began in the west of the archipelago, the fragmentary evidence does not suggest a rolling wave of conversion through adjacent areas; rather, it suggests the process was complicated and slow.

Early history

 Before Islam was established in Indonesian communities, Muslim traders had been present for several centuries. Ricklefs (1991) identifies two overlapping processes by which the Islamisation of Indonesia occurred: (1) Indonesians came into contact with Islam and converted, and (2) foreign Muslim Asians (Indians, Chinese, Arabs, etc.) settled in Indonesia and mixed with local communities. Islam is thought to have been present in Southeast Asia from early in the Islamic era. From the time of the third caliph of Islam, 'Uthman' (644-656), Muslim emissaries and merchants were arriving in China who must have passed through Indonesia sea routes from the Islamic world. It would have been through this contact that Arabic emissaries between 904 and the mid-12th century are thought to have become involved in the Sumatran trading state of Srivijaya.

The earliest accounts of the Indonesian archipelago date from the Abbasid Caliphate. According to those early accounts, the Indonesian archipelago was famous among early Muslim sailors, mainly due to its abundance of precious spice trade commodities such as nutmeg, cloves, galangal and many other spices.

The presence of foreign Muslims in Indonesia does not, however, demonstrate a significant level of local conversion or the establishment of local Islamic states. The most reliable evidence of the early spread of Islam in Indonesia comes from inscriptions on tombstones and a limited number of travellers’ accounts. The earliest legibly inscribed tombstone is dated AH 475 (AD 1082), although as it belongs to a non-Indonesian Muslim, there is doubt as to whether it was transported to Java at a later time. The first evidence of Indonesian Muslims comes from northern Sumatra; Marco Polo, on his way home from China in 1292, reported at least one Muslim town; and the first evidence of a Muslim dynasty is the gravestone, dated AH 696 (AD 1297), of Sultan Malik al Saleh, the first Muslim ruler of Samudera Pasai Sultanate, with further gravestones indicating continued Islamic rule. The presence of the Shafi'i school of thought, which was to later dominate Indonesia, was reported by Ibn Battuta, a Moroccan traveller, in 1346. In his travel log, Ibn Battuta wrote that the ruler of Samudera Pasai was a Muslim who performs his religious duties with utmost zeal. The school of thought he used was Al-Shafi‘i with similar customs to those he had seen in India.

Influences of Zheng He's voyages

Zheng He is credited to have settled Chinese Muslim communities in Palembang and along the shores of Java, the Malay Peninsula, and the Philippines. These Muslims allegedly followed the Hanafi school in the Chinese language. This Chinese Muslim community was led by Hajji Yan Ying Yu, who urged his followers to assimilate and take local names.

Zheng He (1371–1433 or 1435), originally named Ma He, was a Hui court eunuch, mariner, explorer, diplomat, and fleet admiral during China's early Ming dynasty. Zheng commanded expeditionary voyages to Southeast Asia, South Asia, Western Asia, and East Africa from 1405 to 1433. His larger ships stretched 400 feet in length (Columbus's Santa Maria, for comparison, was 85 feet). These carried hundreds of sailors on four tiers of decks. As a favorite of the Yongle Emperor, whose usurpation he assisted, he rose to the top of the imperial hierarchy and served as commander of the southern capital Nanjing (the capital was later moved to Beijing by the Yongle Emperor). These voyages were long neglected in official Chinese histories but have become well-known in China and abroad since the publication of Liang Qichao's Biography of Our Homeland's Great Navigator, Zheng He in 1904. A trilingual stele left by the navigator was discovered on the island of Sri Lanka shortly thereafter.

By region
It was initially believed that Islam penetrated Indonesian society in a largely peaceful way, (which is still largely true according to many scholars) and from the 14th century to the end of the 19th century the archipelago saw almost no organised Muslim missionary activity. Later findings of scholars say that some parts of Java, i.e. Sundanese West Java and the kingdom of Majapahit on East Java was conquered by Javanese Muslims. The Hindu-Buddhist Sunda Kingdom of Pajajaran was conquered by Muslims in the 16th century, while the Muslim-coastal and Hindu-Buddhist-interior part of East Java was often at war. Organised spread of Islam is also evident by the existence of the Wali Sanga (nine holy patriarchs) who are credited for the Islamisation of Indonesia during this period.

Northern Sumatra

Firmer evidence documenting continued cultural transitions comes from two late-14th century gravestones from Minye Tujoh in North Sumatra, each with Islamic inscriptions but in Indian-type characters and the other Arabic. Dating from the 14th century, tombstones in Brunei, Terengganu (northeast Malaysia) and East Java are evidence of Islam's spread. The Trengganu stone has a predominance of Sanskrit over Arabic words, suggesting the representation of the introduction of Islamic law. According to the Ying-yai Sheng-lan: The overall survey of the ocean's shores' (1433) a written account by Zheng He's chronicler and translator Ma Huan: "the main states of the northern part of Sumatra were already Islamic Sultanates. In 1414, he visited the Malacca Sultanate, its ruler Iskandar Shah was Muslim and also his people, and they were very strict believers".

In Kampong Pande, the tombstone of Sultan Firman Syah, the grandson of Sultan Johan Syah, has an inscription stating that Banda Aceh was the capital of the Kingdom of Aceh Darussalam and that it was built on Friday, 1 Ramadhan (22 April 1205) by Sultan Johan Syah after he defeated the Hindu and Buddhist Kingdom of Indra Purba whose capital was Bandar Lamuri.
The establishment of further Islamic states in North Sumatra is documented by late 15th- and 16th-century graves including those of the first and second Sultans of Pedir; Muzaffar Syah, buried (1497) and Ma’ruf Syah, buried (1511). Aceh was founded in the early 16th century and would later become the most powerful North Sumatran state and one of the most powerful in the whole Malay archipelago. The Aceh Empire's first sultan was Ali Mughayat Syah whose tombstone is dated (1530).

The book of Portuguese apothecary Tomé Pires that documents his observations of Java and Sumatra from his 1512 to 1515 visits, is considered one of the most important sources on the spread of Islam in Indonesia. In 1520, Ali Mughayat Syah started military campaigns to dominate the northern part of Sumatra. He conquered Daya, and submitted the people to Islam. Further conquests extended down the east coast, like Pidie and Pasai incorporating several pepper-producing and gold-producing regions. The addition of such regions ultimately led to internal tensions within the Sultanate, as Aceh's strength was as a trading port, whose economic interests vary from those of producing ports.

At this time, according to Pires, most Sumatran kings were Muslim; from Aceh and south along the east coast to Palembang the rulers were Muslim, while south of Palembang and around the southern tip of Sumatra and up the west coast, most were not. In other Sumatran kingdoms, such as Pasai and Minangkabau the rulers were Muslim although at that stage their subjects and peoples of neighboring areas were not, however, it was reported that the religion was continually gaining new adherents.

After the arrival of the Portuguese colonials and the tensions that followed regarding control of the spice trade, the Acehnese Sultan Alauddin al-Kahar (1539–71) sent an embassy to the Ottoman Sultan Suleiman the Magnificent in 1564, requesting Ottoman support against the Portuguese Empire. The Ottomans then dispatched their admiral Kurtoğlu Hızır Reis he set sail with a force of 22 ships carrying soldiers, military equipment and other supplies. According to accounts written by the Portuguese Admiral Fernão Mendes Pinto, the Ottoman fleet that first arrived in Aceh consisted of a few Turks and largely of Muslims from the ports of the Indian Ocean.

East Sumatra and Malay peninsula
Founded around the beginning of the 15th century by Sultan Parameswara, the great Malay trading state The Sultanate of Malacca founded by Sultan Parameswara, was, as the most important trading center of the Southeast Asian archipelago, a center of foreign Muslims, and it thus appears a supporter of the spread of Islam. Parameswara, himself is known to have converted to Islam, and taken the name Iskandar Shah after the arrival of the Hui-Chinese Admiral Zheng He. From Malacca and elsewhere, gravestones survive showing not only its spread in the Malay archipelago but as the religion of a number of cultures and their rulers in the late 15th century.

Central and eastern Java

Inscriptions in Old Javanese rather than Arabic on a significant series of gravestones dating back to 1369 in East Java, indicate that these are almost certainly Javanese, rather than foreign Muslims. Due to their elaborate decorations and proximity to the site of the former Hindu-Buddhist Majapahit capital, Damais concludes that these are the graves of very distinguished Javanese, perhaps even royalty.  This suggests that some of the Javanese elite adopted Islam at a time when the Hindu-Buddhist Majapahit was at the height of its glory.

Ricklefs (1991) argues that these east Javan gravestones, sited and dated at the non-coastal Majapahit, cast doubt on the long-held view that Islam in Java originated on the coast and represented political and religious opposition to the kingdom. As a kingdom with far-reaching political and trading contacts, Majapahit would have almost certainly been in contact with Muslim traders, however there is conjecture over the likelihood of its sophisticated courtiers being attracted to a religion of merchants. Rather, mystical Sufi Muslim teachers, possibly claiming supernatural powers (keramat), are thought to be a more probable agent of religious conversion of Javanese court elites, who had long been familiar with aspects of Hindu and Buddhist mysticism.

Central and East Java, the areas where the ethnic Javanese lived, was still claimed by the Hindu-Buddhist king living in the interior of east java at Daha. The coastal areas such as Surabaya were, however, Islamised and were often at war with the interior, except for Tuban, which remained loyal to the Hindu-Buddhist king. Some of the coastal Muslim lords were converted Javanese, or Muslim Chinese, Indians, Arabs, and Malays who had settled and established their trading state on the coast. This war between the Muslim-coast and Hindu-Buddhist interior also continued long after the fall of the Majapahit by the Demak Sultanate, and the animosity also continues long after both regions had adopted Islam.

When the peoples of the north coast of Java adopted Islam is unclear. Chinese Muslim, Ma Huan who was a follower of Zheng He, the envoy sent by Yongle Emperor of Ming China, visited the Java coast in 1416 and reported in his book, Ying-yai Sheng-lan: The overall survey of the ocean's shores' (1433), that there were only three types of people in Java: Muslims from the west, Chinese (some Muslim) and the heathen Javanese. Since the east Javan gravestones were those of Javanese Muslims fifty years before, Ma Huan's report indicates that Islam may have indeed been adopted by Javanese courtiers before the coastal Javanese.

An early Muslim gravestone dated AH 822 (AD 1419) has been found at Gresik an East Javanese port and marks the burial of Malik Ibrahim.  As it appears, however, that he was a non-Javanese foreigner, the gravestone does not provide evidence of coastal Javanese conversion. Malik Ibrahim was, however, according to Javanese tradition one of the first nine apostles of Islam in Java (the Wali Sanga) although no documentary evidence exists for this tradition. In the late 15th century, the powerful Majapahit empire in Java was at its decline. After having been defeated in several battles, the last Hindu kingdom in Java fell under the rising power of Islamised Kingdom of Demak in 1520.

The Da'wah of Walisongo

The question is: why in the period of only 40–50 years, Islam can be received in such a widespread manner in Java, whereas before it was very difficult to develop? One significant key-factor of the success of Da'wah of Walisongo is how the Walisongo develop an abandoned civilization of Majapahit into a new civilization whose roots form the Majapahit but with Islamic characteristics. For example, until the early Demak era, society is divided into two major groups, such as Majapahit era. First, the Group of Gusti, namely people who live in the palace. Secondly, the Group of Kawula, people who live outside the palace.

Gusti means master, Kawula means slaves or servants, who only have the right to lease, not the right of ownership, because the right of ownership is only belongs to the people with the social status of (Gusti). In the era of Majapahit, all property is owned by the palace (state, or nation, or the kingdom). And if the king wants to give a deserving subject, then by the King's order that person will be given sima land or perdikan land (fief). This also means, if he had been a Kawula, his social status will rise, and he will become a Gusti, and he also has the right of ownership as he was given the simah land (fief).

Walisongo, especially Sheikh Siti Jenar and Sunan Kalijaga, created a new perspective in the cultural and society structure. From the cultural and society structure of "gusti and kawula", they introduce the new community structure which is so-called "Masyarakat", derived from the Arabic term of Musharaka, which means the community of equal and mutual cooperation. It is proven by the absence of the term of "masyarakat", "rakyat", and so on in the Javanese Kawi vocabulary. It's a new term that was brought by Walisongo during their Dha'wah.

One of the methods that were used by the Walisongo is by changing the mindset of the society. People with social status of Gusti pronoun themselves as: intahulun, kulun or ingsun. While the people with social status of Kawula pronoun themselves as: kula or kawula (Javanese), abdi (Sundanese), saya or sahaya (Sumatran): hamba or ambo (Minangkabau). Walisongo changes all those self pronunciation or designation which indicates the meaning of slaves, and replaced it with the term of ingsun, aku, kulun, or awak, and other designations that do not represent the identity of slaves or persons with lower social status. That is the concept of society of Walisongo, society or community of equal and mutual cooperation, which does not possess any discriminations nor discriminate the terms of self designation between subject classes such "gusti and kawula", which is called "Masyarakat". In present days, the term of kula, ambo, abdi, hamba, sahaya or saya, are still being used for the purpose of showing respect toward others, for example: while speaking toward someone older, parents, strangers, and so on.

At the time of Majapahit, in addition to class gusti, people do not have property rights, such as houses, cattle, and so on, because all of them belonged to the palace. If the palace had intent, like wanting to build a bridge or temple and require the sacrifice, the children of class subjects taken and victimized. By changing the structure of society, class subjects can finally rejected because of the equality of the new society system.

Walisongo sees that Hinduism and Buddhism actually were only embraced by the Gusti society inside the palaces. The common religion that generally embraced by the general population outside the palace is Kapitayan, a religion whose devotee toward Sang Hyang Taya. Taya means "suwung" (empty). God of Kapitayan is abstract, it can not be described. Sang Hyang Taya is defined simply as "tan keno kinaya ngapa", it can not be seen, thought, nor imagined. And the might of Sang Hyang Taya whose then represent in various places, such as in stone, monument, trees, and in many other places in this world. Therefore, they makes their offerings over those place, not because they worshiping the stones, trees, monuments, or anything else, but they did it as their devotion toward Sang Hyang Taya whose his might is represent in all over those places. An exactly similar concept of Brahman is found in Hinduism.

This Kapitayan religion, is the ancient religion, in which is studied in the archaeological study, whose its archeological remains and legacy in Western terminology is known as dormant, menhirs, sarcophagus, and many others in which indicates that there is an ancient religion around that place. And by the Dutch historian, this religion is referred to as animism and dynamism, because it worships trees, rocks, and spirits. Meanwhile, according to Ma Huan, such practices are called as nonbeliever.

These Kapitayan's religious values was then adopted by the Walisongo in spreading Islam toward the regions. Because the concept of tawhid in Kapitayan is basically same with the concept of tawhid in Islam: the term of "Tan keno kinaya ngapa" in Kapitayan ("can't be seen, can't be thought, can't be imagined, He is beyond everything"), have the same equal meaning as "laisa kamitslihi syai'un" in Islam ("There is nothing like unto Him"; Qur'an Surah Ash-Syura chapter 42 verse 11).

Walisongo also use the term "Sembahyang" (worshipping Sang Hyang Taya in Kapitayan) in introducing the term of "Shalat" in Islam. In term of places for worship or praying, Walisongo also using the term Sanggar in Kapitayan, which represents a four-square building with an empty hole on its wall as the symbol of Sang Hyang Taya in Kapitayan, not arca or statues as in Hindu or Buddhism. This term of place for praying or worshipping in Kapitayan also used by Walisongo by the name "Langgar" represents the term of Masjid in Islam".

There's also a ritual in form of not eating from morning up until night in Kapitayan, which is called as Upawasa (Puasa or Poso). Incidentally, the ritual of fasting in Hinduism is also called "Upawasa" or "Upavasa". Instead of using the term of fasting or Siyam in Islam, Walisongo used the term of Puasa or Upawasa from the Kapitayan in describing the ritual. The term of Poso Dino Pitu in Kapitayan whose means fasting on the day of the second and the fifth day in which is equal to seven days of fasting, is very similar with the form of fasting on Mondays and Thursdays in Islam. The Tradition of "Tumpengan" of Kapitayan was also being kept by the Walisongo under the Islamic perspective as known as "Sedekah". This is the meaning of the terminology in which Gus Dur (Indonesian fourth president) mentioned as "mempribumikan Islam" (Indigenize Islam).

At the time of Majapahit, there is a ceremony which is called as "Sraddha", a ceremony that being held 12 years after a person's death. There is a time in the Majapahit history, during the Sraddha ceremony a King of Majapahit (Bhre Pamotan Sang Sinagara), a poet namely Mpu Tanakung, composed the "Kidung of Banawa Sekar" (The Ballad of Flowers Boat), to describe how the ceremony was carried out with full opulence and grandeur. This tradition was then called by society around the lakes and beach with the term Sadran or Nyadran (derived from the word Sraddha). Walisongo who derived from Champa also brought religious traditions, such as ceremonies of 3 days, 7 days, 40 days, 10 days, and 1000 days after someone's death. This is a tradition in which derived from Campa, not a native Javanese tradition, nor the Hindu tradition. Because these traditions also exist in parts of Central Asia, such as Uzbekistan and Kazakhstan. In the books of Tradition of Champa, such tradition has already exist since a very long time ago.

In the history of Majapahit's superstition, there are only Yaksa, Pisacas, Wiwil, Rakshasha, Gandharwa, Bhuta, Khinnara, Widyadhara, Ilu-Ilu, Dewayoni, Banaspati, and ancestral spirits, in which known by the people of Majapahit. The people of Majapahit were very rational. They all were sailors and got to know people from all across the globe such as Japan, India, China, Africa, Arabia, Pacific Ocean and many other places. In the Islamic era that detracted from Champa a lot of new superstition appears, such as pocong. This is clearly derived from the Muslim faith, because in Majapahit the dead was burned and not covered with sheet. There are also many other superstition like kuntilanak, tuyul, including the legend of Nyai Roro Kidul or Queen of the Southern Sea who came later.

During the Dha'wah of Walisongo, Islam was spread without any force of arms, not even a single drip of blood was spilled. Only after the Dutch period, especially after the Diponegoro War, the Dutch really run out of funds, they even owe millions of Guldens because of it. And even after Prince Diponegoro arrested, his remains were never subject. The Dutch finally deconstructing the stories about Walisongo, as in Babad Kediri. From this Babad Kediri, it was then emerged the book chronicle of Darmo Gandul and Suluk Gatholoco. the one who authored the book is named Ngabdullah, a person from Pati East Java, who because of poverty, making it lapsed and leaves Islam. He later renamed by the name of Ki Tunggul Wulung and settled in Kediri.

In the essay fiber, there are many stories that contrary to historical fact, such as Demak attacked Majapahit 1478 and the emergence of a fictional character Sabdo Palon Naya Genggong who swore that 500 years after the attack, Majapahit will bounce back. Yet according to the more authentic script and more ancient, in that year that attacked Majapahit is King Girindrawardhana, the Hindu king of Kediri. And because of the very strong influence of that tale, it makes President Soeharto, the second president of Indonesia was very confident so that he sets pass of Aliran Kepercayaan (Beliefs) in Indonesia in the year 1978 (500 years after 1478), as a symbol of truth of the oath of Sabdo Palon about the resurrection of Majapahit.

Secretly, it turns out the Dutch make history essay of themselves to confuse the struggle of Muslims, especially the followers of Prince Diponegoro. The Dutch even made Babad Tanah Jawi of their own version, which is different from the original Babad Tanah Jawi. For example, the text of the Kidung Sunda, described the event of Bubad War, it is said that Gajah Mada kill the King of Sunda and his entire family. This is what made the people of Sunda harbor a grudge against the people of Java. Tracking back from its historical record, the text itself only appeared in Bali in 1860, made by the order of the Dutch. Sunda is a great kingdom, if such an event truly ever happened, it must have been written by the Kingdom of Sunda. The Kingdom of Sunda was very detailed in describing its historical records. Even the traditions of Sunda were written in every detail in the manuscript of "Sanghyang Siksa Kanda ng Karesyan". How come such a great event was never mentioned even once in the Chronicle of Sunda (Babad Sunda). The event itself was never mentioned in the Chronicles of Majapahit, nor in any other historical records. Again, this is the tactic of the Dutch in dividing the society by creating a false history as part of the Dutch policy "Divide and Conquer". From all of the distortion of history, all must have originated from a script written by the Dutch post-Diponegoro War.

In metallurgical technology smelting iron and steel, for example, people of Majapahit had already possess the ability to create the Majapahit's heritage, such as keris, spears, arrows, even barunastra, a giant tipped steel arrows that functioned like an underwater torpedo, in which when it was fired, it had the ability to penetrate and bilge the ship. Demak kingdom as the descendants of Majapahit has the ability to create a large caliber of cannons in which exported to Malacca, Pasai, and even Japan. The fact that Japanese bought guns from Demak sourced from the record of the Portuguese, during the conquered of the Port of Malacca, the Portuguese intelligence sourced that the Malacca fortress was complemented by large-size of cannons imported from Java. When the Portuguese newly arrived from Europe, their ships were uprooted by cannon fire when approaching the port of Malacca. The proof of this can be seen in Fort Surosowan Banten, where in front of it there is a giant cannon named "Ki Amok". As an illustration of the magnitude of the cannon, people can get into the cannon holes. Even the imperial seal of the Kingdom of Demak is still clearly attached to the cannon, which is made in Jepara, a region in the Kingdom of Demak whose famous for its craftsmanship. The term of "bedil besar" ("big guns") and "jurumudi ning bedil besar" ("the driver of the big guns") describes "cannon" and "cannon operators". That was the military technology during the era of Walisongo.

Majapahit famous puppet show is "Wayang Beber", whereas during the Walisongo era is "Wayang Kulit". Walisongo also changed the story of Mahabharata his in which is different from the original version of India. In the Indian version, Five Pandavas have one wife, Draupadi. This means that the concept of polyandry. Walisongo change this concept by telling that Draupadi was the wife of Yudhishthira, the eldest brother. Werkudara or Bima has a wife namely Arimbi, who later he married again with Dewi Nagagini who have children Ontorejo and Ontoseno, and so on. Illustrated that all the Pandavas were polygamy. Whereas the original version, Draupadi polyandry with five Pandavas. Similarly, in the story of Ramayana. Hanuman has two fathers, namely King Kesari Maliawan and God Bayu. By Walisongo, Hanuman referred to as the son of God Bayu. Walisongo even make the pedigree that the gods were descendants of Adam. This can be seen on the Pakem Pewayangan (the grip of puppet show) Ringgit Purwa at Pustaka Raja Purwa in Solo, which is a grip for every puppet masters in Java. So the grip that was used by the puppeteers in Java was the Pakem derived from Walisongo, not India. This puppet spectacle, not only as an entertainment but also functioned as guidance in the propagation of Islam by Walisongo.

In context of literary, the kingdom of Majapahit had already created Kakawin and Kidung. By Walisongo, this literary richness was then enriched by the making of variety of song compositions, such as "Tembang Gedhe" (great song composition), "Tembang Tengahan" (mid song composition),  and "Tembang Alit" (short song composition).  Macapat flourished in coastal areas. Kakawin and Kidung could only be understood by a poet. But for the Tembang, even an illiterate people can understand. This is the method of Walisongo Propagation through the arts and culture.

Another example of the Dha'wah of Walisongo is Slametan which is developed by Sunan Bonang and then followed by the other Sunans. In the Tantrayana (Tantric) religion embraced by kings of Nusantara archipelago, there's a sect in that Tantric religion which is called the Bhairawa Tantra sect that worships the Goddess of Earth, Goddess Durga, Goddess Kali, and others Gods. They have a rituals where they were creating a circle called Ksetra. The largest Ksetra in Majapahit is Ksetralaya, the place today is called Troloyo.

The ritual ceremony itself was known as Upacara Panchamakara (the ceremony of five ma, the malima), namely Mamsya (meat), Matsya (fish), Madya (wine), Maithuna (sexual intercourse), and Mudra (meditation). Men and women formed a circle and all naked. In the center is provided meat, fish, and wine. After eating and drinking, they have sexual intercourse (maituna). After satisfying various desires, they meditated. For higher levels, they were using human flesh for Mamsya replacing meat, Sura fish (shark) for Matsa, and human blood for Madya replacing wine.

In the Indonesian National Museum in Jakarta, there is a statue of a character named Adityawarman with a height of three meters and stands on a pile of skulls. He is the priest of the Bhairawa Tantra, the one who performed the teaching of malima. He was inaugurated and then became the Bhairawa priest carrying the title of Wisesa Dharani, the ruler of the earth. The statue described that he sat on a pile of hundreds of corpses, drinking blood, and laughing uproariously.

Witnessing such situation, Sunan Bonang created a similar event. He entered the center of Bhairawa Tantra in Kediri. As formerly the center of the Bhairawa Tantra, no wonder that the slogan of the City of Kediri now is Canda Bhirawa. During his Dha'wah in Kediri, Sunan Bonang stayed in the west of the river, in the village of Singkal Nganjuk. There he held a similar ceremony, made the similar circle, but all of the participants were all males, in the center of the circle there is the food, and then they pray together. This is called the Kenduri Tradition (festivity tradition) or Slametan. Developed from village to village to match the ceremony of malima (Panchamakara). Therefore, Sunan Bonang was also known as Sunan Wadat Cakrawati, as the leader or imam of Chakra Iswara (Cakreswara).

Therefore, in rural areas, people can be considered a Muslim if he's already stated the Islamic creed, circumcised, and Slametan. So malima was originally not Maling (thievery), Maen (gambling), Madon (adultery), Madat (consuming opium), and Mendem (drunk), but the five elements of Panchamakara. Islam was then growing even faster because the people do not want their children get victimized as in Bhairawa Tantra. Then, they prefer to join Slametan with the aim of "slamet" (safety). This is the way of Walisongo spreads Islam without violence.

In conclusion, about 800 years Islam entered the archipelago, since the year 674 until Walisongo era in 1470, but has yet to be accepted by society en masse. It was then after the era of Walisongo, Islam developed so widespread in the archipelago. And until now, the teaching Walisongo is still run by the majority of Indonesian Muslims.

Western Java
Pires' Suma Oriental reports that Sundanese-speaking West Java was not Muslim in his day, and was indeed hostile to Islam. A Muslim conquest of the area occurred later in the 16th century. In the early 16th century, the Central and East Java (home of the Javanese) were still claimed by the Hindu-Buddhist king living in the interior of East Java at Daha (Kediri). The north coast was, however, Muslim as far as Surabaya and was often at war with the interior. Of these coastal Muslim lords, some were Javanese who had adopted Islam, and others were not originally Javanese but Muslim traders settling along established trading routes including Chinese, Indians, Arabs and Malays. According to Piers, these settlers and their descendants so admired Javanese Hindu-Buddhist culture that they emulate its style and were thus themselves becoming Javanese.

In his study of the Banten Sultanate, Martin van Bruinessen focuses on the link between mystics and royalty, contrasting that Islamisation process with the one which prevailed elsewhere in Java:
"In the case of Banten, the indigenous sources associate the tarekats not with trade and traders but with kings, magical power and political legitimation." He presents evidence that Sunan Gunungjati was initiated into the Kubra, and Shattari,  orders of sufism.

Other areas
There is no evidence of the adoption of Islam by Indonesians before the 16th century in areas outside of Java, Sumatra, the sultanates of Ternate and Tidore in Maluku, and Brunei and the Malay Peninsula.

Indonesian and Malay legends
Although time frames for the establishment of Islam in Indonesian regions can be broadly determined, the historical primary sources cannot answer many specific questions, and considerable controversy surrounds the topic. Such sources do not explain why significant conversions of Indonesians to Islam did not begin until after several centuries of foreign Muslims visiting and living in Indonesia, nor do they adequately explain the origin and development of Indonesia's idiosyncratic strains of Islam, or how Islam came to be the dominant religion in Indonesia. To fill these gaps, many scholars turn to Malay and Indonesian legends surrounding Indonesian conversion to Islam. Ricklefs argues that although they are not reliable historical accounts of actual events, they are valuable in illuminating some of the events is through their shared insights into the nature of learning and magical powers, foreign origins and trade connections of the early teachers, and the conversion process that moved from the elite downwards. These also provide insight into how later generations of Indonesians view Islamisation. These sources include:
 Hikayat Raja-raja Pasai ("The Story of the kings of Pasai") – an Old Malay text that tells how Islam came to "Samudra" (Pasai, northern Sumatra), where the first Indonesian Islamic state was founded.
 Sejarah Melayu ("Malay History") – an Old Malay text, which like Hikayat Raja-raja Pasai tells the story of the conversion of Samudra, but also tells of the conversion of the King of Malacca.
 Babad Tanah Jawi ("History of the land of Java") – a generic name for a large number of manuscripts, in which the first Javanese conversions are attributed to the Wali Sanga ("nine saints").
 Sejarah Banten ("History of Banten") – a Javanese text containing stories of conversion.
Of the texts mentioned here, the Malay texts describe the conversion process as a significant watershed, signified by formal and tangible signs of conversion such as circumcision, the Confession of Faith, and the adoption of an Arabic name. On the other hand, while magical events still play a prominent role in the Javanese accounts of Islamisation, such turning points of conversion as in the Malay texts are otherwise not as evident. This suggests a more adsorptive process for the Javanese, that is consistent with the significantly larger syncretic element in contemporary Javanese Islam in comparison to the relatively orthodox Islam of Sumatra and Malaysia.

Flags of the Sultanates in the East Indies (Indonesia)

See also

 Islam in Indonesia
 History of Indonesia
 Mosques in Indonesia
 Spread of Islam in Southeast Asia
 Spread of Islam

References

Citations

Sources

External links
How Islam came to dominate Indonesia. TRT World.

 
Precolonial states of Indonesia
13th century in Indonesia
Indonesia
13th-century Islam